Giovanni Battista Paggi, B. (1615 – 8 February 1663) was a Roman Catholic prelate who served as Bishop of Brugnato (1655–1663).

Biography
Giovanni Battista Paggi was born in Genoa, Italy in 1615 and ordained a priest in the Barnabite Order.
On 14 June 1655, he was appointed during the papacy of Pope Alexander VII as Bishop of Brugnato. On 20 June 1655, he was consecrated bishop by Giulio Cesare Sacchetti, Cardinal-Bishop of Frascati, with Francesco Antonio Sacchetti, Bishop of Troia, and Giacinto Cordella, Bishop of Venafro, serving as co-consecrators. He served as Bishop of Brugnato until his death on 8 February 1663.

References

External links and additional sources
 (for Chronology of Bishops) 
 (for Chronology of Bishops) 

17th-century Italian Roman Catholic bishops
Bishops appointed by Pope Alexander VII
1615 births
1663 deaths